Cymindis facchinii is a species of ground beetle in the subfamily Harpalinae. It was described by Kabak in 2006 and is endemic to India where it is found in Kashmir and Sonamarg provinces.

References

facchinii
Beetles described in 2006
Endemic fauna of India